Fanny Forrester may refer to:

 Emily Chubbuck (1817–1854), American poet who used the pseudonym Fanny Forrester
 Fanny Forrester (English poet) (1852–1889), English poet of Irish heritage